Fry and Laurie are English comedy double act, mostly active in the 1980s and 1990s. The duo consisted of Stephen Fry and Hugh Laurie, who met in 1980 through mutual friend Emma Thompson while all three attended the University of Cambridge. They initially gained prominence in a television sketch comedy, A Bit of Fry & Laurie (1987, 1989–1995), and have collaborated on numerous other projects including, most notably, the television series Jeeves and Wooster (1990–1993) in which they portrayed P. G. Wodehouse's literary characters Jeeves (Fry) and Wooster (Laurie).

Since the conclusion of A Bit of Fry and Laurie, both have gone on to solo careers in acting, writing and other roles. They reunited for a retrospective show in 2010 titled Fry and Laurie Reunited. On 14 May 2012, Fry announced on Twitter that he and Laurie were working together on a new project. Various press sources have since announced that it is to be an adaptation of The Canterville Ghost (1887) by Oscar Wilde and had been scheduled for release over Christmas 2014, and this animated film was reported by IMDb to be in post production as of January 2022, with 07 October 2022 given as its release date.

Fry and Laurie have remained close friends throughout their careers. Laurie frequently thanks Fry when accepting awards, including at the 2007 Golden Globes when he referred to his former comedy partner, in the old A Bit of Fry and Laurie style, as “...m’colleague Stephen Fry".

Collaborations

Television programmes

 Cambridge Footlights Revue (1981) (BBC2)
 There's Nothing to Worry About! (1982)
 Alfresco (1983) (ITV)
 The Crystal Cube (1983) (BBC2)
 The Young Ones (1984) (BBC2) (appearing in the episode "Bambi")
 Weekend in Wallop (1984) (ITV)
 Saturday Live (1986) (C4)
 Blackadder II (1986) (BBC1) (two episodes together)
 Filthy Rich & Catflap (1987) (BBC2) (appearing in the second episode)
 First Aids (1987) (ITV)
 Blackadder the Third (1987) (BBC1) (one episode together)
 The Secret Policeman's Third Ball (1987) (ITV)
 A Bit of Fry & Laurie (1987 pilot, 1989, 1990, 1992, 1995) (BBC2, BBC1)
 Hysteria! Hysteria! Hysteria! (1988)
 Blackadder's Christmas Carol (1988) (BBC1)
 The New Statesman (appearing in the episode "The Haltemprice Bunker") (1989)
 A Night of Comic Relief 2 (1989) (BBC1)
 Blackadder Goes Forth (1989) (BBC1)
 The Secret Policeman's Biggest Ball (1989) (ITV)
 Hysteria 2 (1989) (C4)
 Jeeves and Wooster (1990–93) (ITV)
 Comic Relief - 1991 (1991) (BBC1)
 Hysteria III (1991) (C4)
 Fry and Laurie Host A Christmas Night with the Stars (1994) (BBC2)
 Live from the Lighthouse (1998)
 The Nearly Complete And Utter History of Everything (2000) (BBC1)
 Blackadder: Back & Forth (1999) (Sky One)
 Fortysomething (2003) (one show together)
 QI (2003) (BBC2) (one episode together)
 Fry and Laurie Reunited (2010) (Gold)
 Fry and Laurie worked with magician and sceptic James Randi on an episode of Randi's British television show.

Films
 Peter's Friends (1992)
 Spice World (1997) (cameos)

Radio shows
 Saturday Night Fry on BBC Radio 4 in 1988 (five shows together)
 Whose Line Is It Anyway? on BBC Radio 4 in 1988 (one show together)

Published materials
Published television scripts
 A Bit of Fry & Laurie (1990)
 A Bit More Fry & Laurie (1991)
 3 Bits of Fry & Laurie (1992)
 Fry & Laurie Bit No. 4 (1995)

Video games
 LittleBigPlanet 3 (2014)

Miscellaneous
Fry and Laurie have also appeared together in various television advertisements, interviews, audio books, and other projects.

References

External links
 
 

English comedy duos
English male comedians